Fat Oxen is a historic home located near Urbana, Frederick County, Maryland, United States. It is a -story Flemish bond brick house over a high rough stone foundation, with a shorter kitchen wing.  It was built about 1775 and is basically Georgian vernacular architecture in style. The home is a notable example of an English farmhouse in a region that was largely populated by German Americans.

Fat Oxen was listed on the National Register of Historic Places in 1979.

References

External links
, including photo in 1976, at Maryland Historical Trust

English-American culture in Maryland
Houses completed in 1775
Georgian architecture in Maryland
Houses in Frederick County, Maryland
Houses on the National Register of Historic Places in Maryland
National Register of Historic Places in Frederick County, Maryland